Tom Botha (born 31 August 1990) is a South African rugby union player, currently playing with the  in Wales for the Welsh Pro14. His regular position is tighthead prop.

Rugby career

2008 : Schools rugby

He represented  at the 2008 Under-18 Academy Week tournament held in George, where he helped his side to victories in all three of their matches. Shortly after the tournament, he earned a call-up to the South Africa Schools Academy side that played against a South Africa Schools side, running out 41–19 winners in a warm-up match prior to the  versus  test match during the 2008 Tri Nations Series. He also made a single appearance for  during the 2008 Under-19 Provincial Championship, coming on as a replacement in their 20–18 victory against  in Cape Town.

2009 : Sharks Under-19

He appeared in all six matches that they played in the competition (starting four of their matches and playing off the bench in the other two) as the Sharks finished in fifth position in the competition.

2010–2012 : Western Province

His time in Durban was short-lived, however, as he returned to Cape Town for the 2010 season. He started in four matches for  during the regular season of Group A of the Under-21 Provincial Championship, helping Western Province finish top of the log with eleven wins in their twelve matches.

Botha started for Western Province in their compulsory friendly match against  prior to the 2011 Currie Cup Premier Division, but didn't feature for the senior side in the competition proper. Instead, Botha played for the Western Province U21 side that tried to retain the title they won in 2010. He started in nine of their first ten matches in the competition – coming on as a replacement in the other – but didn't feature in the play-offs, as Western Province fell short on this occasion, with the s beating them 19–12 in the semi-finals.

He was a key member of Western Province's 2012 Vodacom Cup campaign, starting nine of their ten matches in the competition and playing off the bench in the other. They won all seven of their matches during the regular season to finish top of the Southern Section log to qualify for the quarter finals.

2012–2014 : Montpellier

In October 2012, the player announced that he joined . He played for Montpellier's Under-23 team (the espoirs) during the 2012–2013 season and helped them to winning the competition, beating their  counterparts 37–20 in the final in May 2013. He again played for the Under-23 team during the 2013–2014 season, but failed to make the breakthrough into the first team.

2014–2016 : Eastern Province Kings / Southern Kings

He returned to South Africa in June 2014 by joining Port Elizabeth-based side  on a short-term contract prior to their return to the Premier Division of the Currie Cup. He made his Eastern Province Kings (and Currie Cup) debut in their 16–35 defeat to former side Western Province in the opening round of the competition. At the end of the season, Botha signed a two-year contract extension to remain in Port Elizabeth until the end of 2016.

He appeared in just one match during the 2015 Vodacom Cup – a 19–27 defeat to  – with a rib injury keeping him out for the remainder of the competition.

At the end of 2015, the worsening financial situation at the Eastern Province Kings resulted in all players' contracts being declared null and void, but Botha was one of the first 20 players that joined the  Super Rugby side in the 2016 Super Rugby season.

2016–present : Free State Cheetahs / Cheetahs

In May 2016, the  announced that Botha signed a two-year deal with the Bloemfontein-based side, joining them on 1 August 2016.

References

1990 births
Living people
Cheetahs (rugby union) players
Eastern Province Elephants players
Free State Cheetahs players
Ospreys (rugby union) players
Rugby union players from Bellville, South Africa
Rugby union props
South African rugby union players
Southern Kings players
Western Province (rugby union) players